The 1960 Hawaii Rainbows football team represented the University of Hawaiʻi at Mānoa as an independent during the 1960 NCAA College Division football season. In their ninth season under head coach Hank Vasconcellos, the Rainbows compiled a 3–7 record. The university would not play varsity football for the 1961 season, but returned for the 1962 season.

Schedule

References

Hawaii
Hawaii Rainbow Warriors football seasons
Hawaii Rainbows football